The American Institute of Baking, now known as AIB International, was founded in 1919 as a technology and information transfer center for bakers and food processors.

Organization

Staff includes experts in the fields of baking production, experimental baking, cereal science, nutrition, food safety, and hygiene. AIB is headquartered in Manhattan, Kansas.

References

Baking industry
Buildings and structures in Riley County, Kansas
Libraries in Kansas
Education in Riley County, Kansas
Manhattan, Kansas
Food science institutes